Bear Lake Township is the name of some places in the U.S. state of Michigan:

 Bear Lake Township, Kalkaska County, Michigan
 Bear Lake Township, Manistee County, Michigan

Michigan township disambiguation pages